The Torneig Internacional Els Gorchs is a tournament for professional female tennis players played on outdoor hardcourts. The event is now classified as a $100,000 (2019: $60k, 2018: $25k; 2005–2013: $10k) ITF Women's Circuit tournament and has been held in Les Franqueses del Vallès, Spain, since 2005.

Past finals

Singles

Doubles

External links
 ITF search
 Website

ITF Women's World Tennis Tour
Hard court tennis tournaments
Tennis tournaments in Spain
Recurring sporting events established in 2018